Bandulla, New South Wales is a rural locality and a civil Parish of Gowen County in central west New South Wales located at 31°49'11.7"S 149°07'04.2"E.

The civil parish is on the Castlereagh River and the town of Mendooran, New South Wales is on the opposite bank.

History
The Bandulla, New South Wales was inhabited by the Wiradjuri tribe before white settlement. The first European to visit the area was surveyor John Evans who came as close as 10 kilometres in 1815. Two years later it was John Oxley's group that passed through the area while conducting one of the first inland expeditions.

References

Localities in New South Wales
Geography of New South Wales